Olga Petersen (born 12. September 1982 in Omsk, Russia) is a German politician of the Alternative for Germany (AfD).

Life 
Olga Petersen was born into a Russian-German family in 1982 in Siberia, which then was then part of the Soviet Union. At the age of 16, she moved to Hamburg with her family. Petersen completed training as a medical assistant.

Petersen is an assessor on the regional board of the AfD Hamburg and deputy chair  on the district board of Harburg. In the elections in Hamburg 2020, Petersen was elected to the senate. With 4,018 votes, she achieved the third best result of the AfD Hamburg candidates. Petersen opposes environmental, nutritional and sexual education at school, "left-wing gender policy",  and vaccination obligations. She advocates financial relief for freelance midwives.

Petersen is divorced and has four children.

External links
 Website: Olga Petersen
 AfD Hamburg: Olga Petersen
 AfD parliamentary group Hamburg: Olga Petersen

References

1982 births
Living people
Alternative for Germany politicians
Politicians from Hamburg
Russian emigrants to Germany
21st-century German women politicians